Close to Paradise is the second studio album by Patrick Watson, released on September 26, 2006. On September 24, 2007, the album won the Polaris Music Prize, after reaching the finals alongside such other albums as Neon Bible (Arcade Fire), Ashtray Rock (Joel Plaskett Emergency), Woke Myself Up (Julie Doiron), and The Reminder (Feist).

Track listing 

 "Close to Paradise"
 "Daydreamer"
 "Slip Into Your Skin"
 "Giver"
 "Weight of the World"
 "The Storm"
 "Mr. Tom"
 "Luscious Life"
 "Drifters"
 "Man Under the Sea"
 "The Great Escape"
 "Sleeping Beauty"
 "Bright Shiny Lights"

In popular culture 
The song "The Great Escape" was featured on episode 16 of the third season of Grey's Anatomy, which aired on February 15, 2007. It also appears in a commercial for Tropicana Products and the movie One Week. It also features during the credit sequences of The High Cost of Living. The song also appears in the movie "Struck by Lightning".

Certifications

References

External links 
 Secret City Records album site

2006 albums
Patrick Watson (musician) albums
Polaris Music Prize-winning albums
Secret City Records albums